Bizzy Lizzy is a British children's TV series from the 1960s. Bizzy Lizzy is a little girl whose dress has a magic flower. When she touches it, her wishes come true – but if she makes more than four wishes in a day, all her previous wishes are undone. Her first wish each day is to make her Eskimo doll, Little Mo, come to life.

Watch With Mother co producer Maria Bird narrated the 'Bizzy Lizzy' stories.

Bizzy Lizzy stories originally formed part of Watch with Mother'''s Picture Book series in the early 1960s, before getting her own 13-part series in 1967.

The comic Pippin'' featured regular Bizzy Lizzy adventures from 1967 onwards.

References

BBC children's television shows
1960s British children's television series
Television series about children